Cithaerias is a Neotropical butterfly genus from the subfamily Satyrinae in the family Nymphalidae.

Species
 Cithaerias andromeda (Fabricius, 1775)
 Cithaerias phantoma (Fassl, 1922)
 Cithaerias pireta (Stoll, [1780])
 Cithaerias pyritosa (Zikán, 1942)
 Cithaerias pyropina (Salvin & Godman, 1868)

References

External links
 Nymphalidae.net taxonomic list

Haeterini
Nymphalidae of South America
Butterfly genera
Taxa named by Jacob Hübner